The O Music Awards  (commonly abbreviated as the OMAs) is an awards show presented by MTV to honor music, technology and intersection between the two. The 1st O Music Award ceremony was held on April 28, 2011 on Fremont Street in Downtown Las Vegas. The 3rd O Music Awards was held on June 27, 2012. The show continues year round in the form of a music and tech blog which is a collaboration of "The O Music Blog" and a New York-based LIVE events series called "Unboxed" which features music, tech, art and interactivity.

Past winners include Spotify (Best Music App), Björk (Digital Genius Award), Way Out West (Most Innovative Festival), CrowdJuke (Best Music Hack) and Lady Gaga (Must Follow Artist On Twitter, Innovative Artist). The show has also featured up-and-coming acts like Foster The People and Alabama Shakes, as well as icons like The Flaming Lips and Robyn.

Running in tandem with the awards and performances, O Music Awards has achieved 3 Guinness World Records. During the inaugural O Music Awards in Las Vegas in April 2011, rapper Chiddy of Chiddy Bang received Guinness World Records titles for the Longest Freestyle Rap and the Longest Marathon Rapping record after rapping for 9 hours, 16 minutes and 22 seconds. For O Music Awards 2, the show took on the goal of the Longest Team Dance Marathon. A group of 13 dancers assembled at LA’s famed club The Roxy on Halloween Eve to take on the record. 24 hours later, all 13 dancers were still standing and broke the record. The effort also raised more than $32,000 to fight bullying, with the money divided equally between the Gay, Lesbian & Straight Education Network (GLSEN), the It Gets Better Project, the Gay Straight Alliance Network (GSA), Human Rights Campaign (HRC), Gay & Lesbian Alliance Against Defamation (GLAAD) and The Trevor Project.

Award Winners

2011
O Music Awards 2011: I

 Best Fan Cover: Alex Goot
 Funniest Music Short: Lonely Island, I Just Had Sex
 Innovative Artist: Lady Gaga
 Must Follow Artist on Twitter: Lady Gaga
 Most Innovative Music Video: Andy Grammer, Keep Your Head Up
 Fan Army FTW: Tokio Hotel’s Aliens
 NSFW Music Video: Thirty Seconds to Mars, "Hurricane"
 Most Viral Dance: Willow Smith, Whip My Hair
 Best Independent Music Blog: Aquarium Drunkard
 Best Music Discovery Service: Pandora
 Best Performance Series: Daryl Hall, "Live From Daryl’s House"
 Favorite F**k Yeah Tumblr: F**k Yeah Adam Lambert
 Favorite Animated GIF: Nicki Minaj
 Best Fan Forum: Michael Jackson – MJJCommunity
 Best Music Hack: Invisible Instruments
 Best Animal Performance: Parrot Dancing To Willow Smith’s Whip My Hair
 Best Tweet: Kanye West – “I hate when I’m on a flight and I wake up with a water bottle next to me like oh great now I gotta be responsible for this water bottle”

O Music Awards 2011: II

 Must Follow Artist on Twitter: Adam Lambert
 Fan Army FTW: Tokio Hotel's Aliens
 Best Lyrics Video: Joe Jonas, See No More
 Best Artist With a Camera Phone: Demi Lovato
 Oops I Did It Online: James Blunt
 Best Web-Born Artist: Kina Grannis
 Best Vintage Viral Video: Nirvana Smells Like Teen Spirit
 Digital Genius Award: Björk
 Best Fan Cover: Marc Martel Somebody to Love by Queen
 Hottest Music NILF: Katie Morse
 WTF I Love This Award: Nyan Cat
 Too Much Ass for TV: Marilyn Manson, "Born Villain"
 Most Outrageous Tweet: @BritneySpears to @DJPaulyD: "Hope you enjoyed your dance! Was tough getting my legs around that big blowout :)"
 Best Music Forum: Rap Godfathers
 Most Innovative Festival: Way Out West
 Best Music App: SoundCloud
 Best Music Hack: CrowdJuke
 Beyond the Blog: Needle Drop
 Most Addictive Social Music Service: Spotify
 Biggest Superfan: Billy Humanoid

2012
O Music Awards 2012:
 Best Artist With A Cameraphone: Selena Gomez
 Best Artist/Digital Entrepreneur: Katy Goodman 
 Best Music App: Artist growth
 Best Music Hack: Bohemian Rhapsichord
 Best Music Teacher Replacement: Bandhappy
 Best Online Concert Experience: 30 Seconds to Mars
 Best Protest Song: "Bohemian Rhapsody"
 Best Web-Born Artist: Karmin
 Beyond the Blog Award: Metal Injection
 Beyond the DJ: Most Innovative Solo Performer: MNDR
 Digital Genius Award: iamamiwhoami
 Fan Army FTW: Tokio Hotel: Aliens
 Hottest Music NILF: Tatiana Simonian: Head of Music at Twitter
 Most Addictive Social Music Service: Myxer Social Radio
 Most Adorable Viral Star: Abby Koocher: "Bong Pugz"
 Most Extreme Fan Outreach: Riot in Paris
 Most F***ed-Up Live Performance Gone Viral: Kelvin Cheung: Executes Epic Drum Solo Fail
 Most Innovative Music Video: We The Kings Say You Like Me
 Most Intense Social Spat: Frances Cobain vs. Courtney Love
 Must Follow Artist on Twitter: Adam Lambert
 Too Much Ass For TV: Big Freedia: "Booty Battle" Video Game
 WTF I Love This Award: Drinkify

References

External links
 

Paramount Media Networks
American music awards
Awards established in 2011